Benjamin W. Davidson House, also known as Oak Lawn, is a historic plantation house located near Huntersville, Mecklenburg County, North Carolina. It was built about 1820, and is a two-story, five bay, Georgian / Federal style frame dwelling. It has gable roof and exterior brick end chimneys.  The front facade have one-story, three bay, hipped roof porch.

It was listed on the National Register of Historic Places in 1976.

References

Plantation houses in North Carolina
Houses on the National Register of Historic Places in North Carolina
Georgian architecture in North Carolina
Federal architecture in North Carolina
Houses completed in 1820
Houses in Charlotte, North Carolina
National Register of Historic Places in Mecklenburg County, North Carolina